The New Frontier is a 1935 American Western film starring John Wayne, directed by Carl Pierson for Republic Pictures. (In 1939, Wayne appeared in a Three Mesquiteers movie entitled New Frontier, which was years later retitled Frontier Horizon to avoid confusion.)

Cast
 John Wayne as John Dawson
 Muriel Evans as Hanna Lewis
 Warner Richmond as Ace Holmes
 Al Bridge as Kit
 Sam Flint as Milt Dawson
 Murdock MacQuarrie as Tom Lewis
 Allan Cavan as Minister Shaw
 Mary MacLaren as Mrs. Shaw 
 Theodore Lorch as Joe 
 Glenn Strange as Norton
 Philip Kieffer as Army Officer
 Frank Ball as Ted

See also
 John Wayne filmography

References

External links

1935 films
1935 Western (genre) films
American Western (genre) films
American black-and-white films
Republic Pictures films
1930s English-language films
1930s American films